Thomas Brooks Mills (October 12, 1857March 19, 1930) was an American politician and businessman.  He was the 35th Speaker of the Wisconsin State Assembly, and also served in the Wisconsin State Senate in the 1890s.

Biography
Born in the town of Manchester, Jackson County, Wisconsin, Mills went to the McMynn Academy in Racine, Wisconsin. In 1890, Mills moved to West Superior, Wisconsin and was in the real estate and lumber business.

He served in the Wisconsin State Assembly from 1885 to 1891 and was a Republican. He also served as speaker of the Wisconsin Assembly in 1887 and 1889. From 1895 to 1899, Mills served in the Wisconsin State Senate. While in the Wisconsin Legislature, Mills was able to help locate the Superior Normal School (now University of Wisconsin–Superior) in Superior, Wisconsin.

He served as grand exalted ruler of the Benevolent and Protective Order of Elks.

Mills died suddenly in Clearwater, Florida on March 19, 1930.

Notes

External links

1857 births
1930 deaths
People from Jackson County, Wisconsin
Politicians from Superior, Wisconsin
University of Wisconsin–Superior
Businesspeople from Wisconsin
Republican Party Wisconsin state senators
Speakers of the Wisconsin State Assembly
Republican Party members of the Wisconsin State Assembly